Purschenstein Castle in Neuhausen/Erzgeb. in East Germany was built in the late 12th century, around 1200, probably by Boresch I (Borso). The toll and escort castle protected a salt road running from Central Germany to Bohemia. This long-distance trading route, also called the Old Bohemian Track (Alter Böhmischer Steig), ran from Leipzig past present-day Neuhausen and over the Deutscheinsiedler Saddle towards Prague.

In 2005, the castle was bought by a Dutch businessman. Since then it has been renovated and houses a hotel, the Schlosshotel Purschenstein.

Gallery

See also 
 List of castles in Saxony

External links 

 The von Schönberg at Purschenstein
 Home page of Purschenstein Castle
 Photo gallery of Purschenstein Castle
 detailed information on Purschenstein as part of Project "Alte Salzstraße"

Castles in Saxony
Buildings and structures in Mittelsachsen
Neuhausen, Saxony